Paul Simon Taylor (born 15 December 1979) is a retired English professional mixed martial artist who formerly competed in the Lightweight division of the Ultimate Fighting Championship. A professional competitor from 2002 until 2013, Taylor also competed for Cage Rage.

Mixed martial arts career
Taylor fights for Team Kaobon of Liverpool and is a former WPKC World Kickboxing Champion. Taylor got into MMA when his coach entered him in the UK's first cage tournament, Cage Rage. Taylor had given up kickboxing after becoming disillusioned at the lack of money in the sport.

After giving up kickboxing, Taylor decided to retrain as a carpenter whilst doing MMA on the side, but eventually trained MMA full-time until his retirement.

Ultimate Fighting Championship
Taylor sent a DVD of his fighting to the UFC to try and secure a contract with the organization and they signed him immediately.

In his UFC debut, Taylor stopped previously undefeated Edilberto de Oliveira via TKO due to strikes early in the third round.

His second UFC fight at UFC 75 was a loss via armbar to Marcus Davis. Although Taylor lost the fight he came close to winning with the referee seconds away from stopping the action due to Taylor connecting with a high kick and landing several blows on a rocked Davis. Due to its high pace and excitement the fight was awarded Fight of the Night.

His next fight at UFC 80 was a loss via unanimous decision to fellow countryman Paul Kelly. Although he lost, Taylor along with Kelly was awarded $35,000 as a bonus for Fight of the Night. This was the second time that Taylor had won the award.

Taylor fought Jess Liaudin in a rematch at UFC 85. Taylor won by split decision.

Taylor met MMA veteran Chris Lytle at UFC 89 which took place at the National Indoor Arena in Birmingham, England. Lytle won a unanimous decision (29–28, 29–28, 30–27). The decision resulted in loud boos and Taylor was surprised at Lytle being awarded the judges' decision. Sherdog, MMAWeekly and MMAJunkie thought Taylor had won the decision. The fight was awarded Fight of the Night honors and both fighters received $40,000 following their exciting, action packed fight. Although this was Taylor's third defeat in the octagon, he had won Fight of the Night awards on three occasions when he had been defeated in the UFC.

Taylor next fought John Hathaway at UFC 105 in Manchester, England, losing via unanimous decision.

Taylor was expected to make his lightweight debut against John Gunderson on 10 April 2010 at UFC 112. However, due to complications after making the weight cut, Taylor was not medically cleared to fight.

Taylor next faced Sam Stout on 23 October 2010 at UFC 121. The fight saw both fighters attempt kicks. The first round saw Stout bloody Taylor's nose and successfully gain a takedown. Taylor came back in the second, catching Stout on the inside. Stout went on to win a split decision (29–28, 28–29, 30–27).

Taylor next faced Gabe Ruediger on 5 February 2011 at UFC 126. Taylor won via KO after landing a head kick and follow up punches in the second round.

Taylor was expected to face John Makdessi on 14 August 2011 at UFC on Versus 5. However, Makdessi was forced from the bout with an injury and replaced by Donald Cerrone. However it was later revealed that Taylor had broken his foot and was forced out of his scheduled bout and replaced by Charles Oliveira.

Taylor was expected to face Anthony Njokuani on 5 November 2011 at UFC 138. However, just days before the event, Taylor sustained a whiplash injury during a minor traffic collision forcing him from the bout.  With no time to find a suitable replacement the bout was scrapped.

Taylor/Njokuani was expected to take place on 11 July 2012 at UFC on Fuel TV: Munoz vs. Weidman. However, Taylor was forced out of the bout with yet another injury, and replaced by Rafael dos Anjos.

Taylor was expected to return from the extended hiatus and the bout with Njokuani scheduled for a third time on 26 October 2013 at UFC Fight Night 30. However, Taylor was forced to pull out of the bout once again with another injury and was replaced this time by Al Iaquinta. After the most recent withdrawal, the UFC announced that Taylor has retired from MMA.

Championships and accomplishments
Ultimate Fighting Championship
Fight of the Night (Three times)

Mixed martial arts record

|-
| Win
| align=center| 11–6–1 (1)
| Gabe Ruediger
| KO (head kick and punches)
| UFC 126
| 
| align=center| 2
| align=center| 1:42
| Las Vegas, Nevada, United States
| 
|-
| Loss
| align=center| 10–6–1 (1)
| Sam Stout
| Decision (split)
| UFC 121
| 
| align=center| 3
| align=center| 5:00
| Anaheim, California, United States
| 
|-
| Loss
| align=center| 10–5–1 (1)
| John Hathaway
| Decision (unanimous)
| UFC 105
| 
| align=center| 3
| align=center| 5:00
| Manchester, England
| 
|-
| Win
| align=center| 10–4–1 (1)
| Peter Sobotta
| Decision (unanimous)
| UFC 99
| 
| align=center| 3
| align=center| 5:00
| Cologne, Germany
| 
|-
| Loss
| align=center| 9–4–1 (1)
| Chris Lytle
| Decision (unanimous)
| UFC 89
| 
| align=center| 3
| align=center| 5:00
| Birmingham, England
| 
|-
| Win
| align=center| 9–3–1 (1)
| Jess Liaudin
| Decision (split)
| UFC 85
| 
| align=center| 3
| align=center| 5:00
| London, England
| 
|-
| Loss
| align=center| 8–3–1 (1)
| Paul Kelly
| Decision (unanimous)
| UFC 80
| 
| align=center| 3
| align=center| 5:00
| Newcastle, England
| 
|-
| Loss
| align=center| 8–2–1 (1)
| Marcus Davis
| Submission (armbar)
| UFC 75
| 
| align=center| 1
| align=center| 4:14
| London, England
| 
|-
| Win
| align=center| 8–1–1 (1)
| Edilberto de Oliveira
| TKO (strikes)
| UFC 70
| 
| align=center| 3
| align=center| 0:37
| Manchester, England
| 
|-
| NC
| align=center| 7–1–1 (1)
| Che Mills
| No Contest
| Cage Rage Contenders 3
| 
| align=center| 1
| align=center| N/A 
| England
| 
|-
| Win
| align=center| 7–1–1
| Paul Jenkins
| KO (punch)
| Road to Tokyo
| 
| align=center| 1
| align=center| 1:08
| England
| 
|-
| Loss
| align=center| 6–1–1
| Yuki Sasaki
| Submission (armbar)
| Pain and Glory 2006
| 
| align=center| 1
| align=center| N/A 
| England
| 
|-
| Win
| align=center| 6–0–1
| Jonas Majauskas
| TKO (strikes)
| Walsall Fight Night
| 
| align=center| 1
| align=center| 0:53
| England
| 
|-
| Win
| align=center| 5–0–1
| Zelg Galešic
| TKO (punches)
| Urban Destruction 1
| 
| align=center| 3
| align=center| N/A
| England
| 
|-
| Win
| align=center| 4–0–1
| Carl Morgan
| Submission (kimura)
| CFC 3: Cage Carnage
| 
| align=center| 3
| align=center| N/A 
| England
| 
|-
| Win
| align=center| 3–0–1
| Daan Kooiman
| TKO (strikes)
| CFC 2: Cage Carnage
| 
| align=center| 1
| align=center| N/A 
| England
| 
|-
| Win
| align=center| 2–0–1
| John Flemming
| Submission (guillotine choke)
| Pain and Glory 2004
| 
| align=center| 1
| align=center| N/A 
| England
| 
|-
| Win
| align=center| 1–0–1
| Jess Liaudin
| Decision
| Cage Rage 2
| 
| align=center| 3
| align=center| 5:00
| England
| 
|-
| Draw
| align=center| 0–0–1
| Matt Ewin
| Draw
| Cage Rage 1
| 
| align=center| N/A
| align=center| N/A
| England
|

References

External links

Official UFC Profile
Pure MMA

1979 births
Living people
Sportspeople from Walsall
English male kickboxers
English male mixed martial artists
Ultimate Fighting Championship male fighters
Welterweight mixed martial artists
Lightweight mixed martial artists